The following table lists the highest and lowest temperatures recorded in each region in Italy, in both Celsius and Fahrenheit.

*Also on earlier date or dates in that region or city.

Notes

External links
Temperature estreme AM/ENAV
Le temperature record assolute in Italia
Record Regionali

Climate of Italy
Italy-related lists
Italy